Lentera Timur was the fifteenth studio album by Malaysian pop singer-songwriter Dato' Siti Nurhaliza which was released on 26 December 2008, four years after the 2004 Indian Ocean tsunami. It is the most anticipated album since her last traditional album, Sanggar Mustika, which was released in 2002. The album is set to sell more than 100,000 copies.

Background
Lentera Timur contains eleven songs using composers from Malaysia and Indonesia. The production of the album has started since 2006, but due to lacking in materials the album has since been put on hold. With the help of MACP, Siti gathered enough materials from composers like Pak Ngah, M. Nasir, Adnan Abu Hassan, just to name a few, to produce a traditional contemporary album, Lentera Timur.

Track listing
The album was previously rumoured to contain twelve or more songs. When the album was released, however, one song composed by Radhi (OAG), Langit Masih Cerah didn't make it to the final cut. Aidit Alfian also confirmed his track didn't make to the final cut.

Awards

2009

References

2008 albums
Albums produced by Siti Nurhaliza
Malay-language albums
Siti Nurhaliza albums